José María Lasa Ibarguren (born 3 March 1948) is a former Spanish footballer who played mainly as a right back.

He amassed La Liga totals of 287 games and 39 goals, representing in the competition Granada, Athletic Bilbao and Zaragoza.

Football career
Born in Andoain, Gipuzkoa, Lasa reached the professional level at the age of 21, when he signed with Real Valladolid from CD Logroñés in 1968. He spent two seasons in Segunda División with the former club, being relegated in the second; he started playing as a winger.

Lasa made his debut in La Liga with Granada CF, his first game occurring on 13 September 1970 in a 1–1 away draw against Elche CF, where he scored his team's goal. He finished the campaign with a further eight goals in 30 games, helping to a final tenth position.

Lasa joined fellow league side Athletic Bilbao in the summer of 1972. He netted seven times from 32 appearances in his first year, which ended in conquest of the Copa del Generalísimo after a 2–0 defeat of CD Castellón.

During his years at the San Mamés Stadium, Lasa was eventually reconverted into a right back. He left in 1980, having appeared in 222 matches across all competitions and scored 23 goals. This included 15 in the UEFA Cup, one of them being the second leg of the 1977 final, lost to Juventus F.C. on the away goals rule.

Lasa closed out his professional career at the end of 1979–80, after two seasons in the top flight with Real Zaragoza. He retired altogether four years later, with amateurs Abadiño KE.

Honours
Athletic Bilbao
Copa del Generalísimo: 1972–73

References

External links

1948 births
Living people
People from Andoain
Spanish footballers
Footballers from the Basque Country (autonomous community)
Association football fullbacks
Association football wingers
Association football utility players
La Liga players
Segunda División players
Tercera División players
CD Logroñés footballers
Real Valladolid players
Granada CF footballers
Athletic Bilbao footballers
Real Zaragoza players
Spain under-23 international footballers
Sportspeople from Gipuzkoa